Mwanga is a town in northern Tanzania at the foot of the north Pare Mountains. It is the district capital of Mwanga District.

Transport
Paved Trunk road T2 from Dar es Salaam to Arusha passes through the town.

The Usambara Railway from Tanga to Arusha passes through Mwanga as well.

Population
According to the 2012 national census the population of Mwanga town (Mwanga Ward) is 15,783.

References

Populated places in Kilimanjaro Region